The men's 5000 metres at the 1971 European Athletics Championships was held in Helsinki, Finland, at Helsinki Olympic Stadium on 12 and 14 August 1971.

Medalists

Results

Final
14 August
Contrary to the 10,000-metre race of these European Athletics Championships, the 5,000-metre final was run at a slow pace for most of its laps.  Early during the final, the Soviet Union's Vladimir Afonin was pushed by one or more other runners, fell down, and dropped out of the race.  Finland's Juha Väätäinen, who was a strong pre-race favourite, given his explosive kick in the 10,000-metre race, kept observing the situation without taking the lead before the final lap.  So did the two other pre-race favourites, France's Jean Wadoux and West Germany's Harald Norpoth.  Although Wadoux was several seconds faster than Väätäinen in 1,500 metres, for some strange reason the Frenchman did not try to break away from the Finn before the final lap.  Neither did Norpoth, who was also a fast 1,500-metre runner, having placed fourth in that distance at the 1968 Mexico City Summer Olympics.  At the start of the final lap, there were still at least eight or nine runners in the lead group.  Finland's young Lasse Viren tried to sprint into the lead, but he was pushed so hard by some other runners that he nearly lost his balance for a few seconds.  With about 300 metres left, Väätäinen unleashed his furious kick, and only Wadoux and Norpoth were able to follow him.  On the final bend, Väätäinen began to pull away from Wadoux and Norpoth, and stretched his lead further on the home straight.  For some seconds, it looked as if also Norpoth would pass Wadoux, but then the French runner was able to accelerate enough to leave the West German runner with the bronze medal.  As a result of Väätäinen's double European titles in the long-distance races, a new enthusiasm for the long-distance running began in Finland.  (Väätäinen & Eeli Aalto, One More Lap / Kierros viela (Finland, 1972);  Raevuori, Antero, Lasse Viren:  The Gilded Spikes / Kullatut piikkarit (Finland, c. 1976);  Wunsche, Wolfgang, The Heroes of the Race Tracks (the Finnish edition, c. 1984);  https://www.youtube.com/watch?v=8nE-TxH2DdQ  EUROPEI DI HELSINKI 1971 5000 VAATAINEN.)

Heats
12 August

Heat 1

Heat 2

Heat 3

Participation
According to an unofficial count, 28 athletes from 16 countries participated in the event.

 (1)
 (1)
 (2)
 (3)
 (3)
 (1)
 (2)
 (2)
 (1)
 (1)
 (2)
 (1)
 (1)
 (3)
 (3)
 (1)

References

5000 metres
5000 metres at the European Athletics Championships